Crivăț is a north-easterly wind in Moldavia, Dobruja, and the Bărăgan Plain parts of Romania. In the winter, it blows at speeds of up to 30–35 m/s (108–126 km/h, 67-78 mph), creating blizzard conditions.
Also can be found in the region of Brasov.

References 

Winds
Geography of Romania